The Mayordomo mayor (High Steward) was the Officer of the Royal Household and Heritage of the Crown of Spain in charge of the person and rooms of the King of Spain. The Office of “Mayordomo mayor” was suppressed after the proclamation of the Second Spanish Republic in 1931 and never re-created after the restoration of the Monarchy in 1975, but it can be said that it is the historical precedent of the modern Head of the Royal Household of Spain.

Historical precedents 

Being a historical precedent the Office of “Mayordomo” of the Kingdom of Castile, the “Mayordomo mayor” of the King of Spain was in charge of the entire organization of the Royal Palace and of its government, having civil and even criminal jurisdiction within its walls through the so-called “Bureo” tribunal.

Regime during the 19th and 20th centuries 

Diverse dispositions regulated in the 19th and 20th centuries his functions, but they must be outlined the Royal decrees of October 28 of 1847 and September 4 of 1885.

During the reigns of the last three Kings before the Second Spanish Republic, Isabel II, Alfonso XII and Alfonso XIII, the “Mayordomo mayor” coordinated the whole palatial organization being, from 1840, the highest Office of the Royal Court and such denominated “Jefe Superior de Palacio” (High Chief of the Palace). Only a peer that had the rank of Grandee of Spain could be nominated for this Office.

Also, traditionally, the “Mayordomo mayor” was higher hierarchically than the “Sumiller de Corps”. During the reign of Alfonso XII and part of the reign of Alfonso XIII (until 1907) this latter Office was suppressed.

The “Mayordomo mayor” was equally the holder of the privy seal, or “Guardasellos” as he was called. In that position he assured the signature of all sort of documents by the King and the link between him and the Government.

He did not have jurisdiction as in former times but the Prosecution Law required his official permission for every police inspection within the walls of all the Royal palaces.

In that which concerned to his role in the activities of official nature, the “Mayordomo” intervened, between others:

 In royal births and baptisms where the invitations were dispatched by him, occupying the immediate site behind the Monarch.
 In Public Chapels where he delivered the prayer-book to the King and was placed, also, immediately behind.
 In the Lavatory of Poor, during Easter, in which he helped the Monarch to serve the plates in the later lunch that was offered.
 In the ceremony of the Coverage of  the Grandees where he dispatched the invitations on behalf of the King and fixed the order.
 In official banquets in which he occupied one of the head-boards of the table.
 In official audiences in which he fixed the day and hour.
 In public ceremonies, in which he was placed in the first position close to the Caballerizo mayor.

Under the “Mayordomo” they were the King of Arms, as charged with the heraldry, the processes of titles of nobility and the management of the dignities. The dean of this class in 1931 was Don Jose de Rújula and Ochotorena, Marquess of Ciadoncha. The Office of King of Arms was suppressed after the proclamation of the Second Spanish Republic in 1931 and never re-created after the restoration of the Monarchy in 1975. He was, at the same time, the high chief of the Court honorary servants called  “Gentilhombres Grandes de España con ejercicio y servidumbre” (Gentlemen of the bedchamber Grandees of Spain), of the “Mayordomos de semana” (Weeckly stewards literally) and of those called “Gentilhombres de camara con ejercicio” (Gentlemen of the bedchamber), both (but especially the first and second ones) with certain duties attached to the person of the King.

Also the Physicians of Chamber were under his dependence with a salary of 10.000 pesetas per year each one, accompanying the King in trips, hunts etc. Traditionally the Physician of Chamber who assisted to royal births was awarded with the peerage as it was the case of the first Marquess of San Gregorio and the first Count of San Diego. In 1931 the Physicians of the Chamber were Don Jacobo Lopez Elizagaray and Don Fernando Enríquez of Salamanca.

Also, this Office of Physician was suppressed after the proclamation of the Second Spanish Republic in 1931 and never re-created after the restoration of the Monarchy in 1975.

The Private Secretary to the King was also under the “Mayordomo”. He was in charge of the ordinary matters of the Monarch and was his more faithful assistant. During almost the whole reign of Alfonso XIII, and in the moment of his exile, this Office was held by Don Emilio de Torres y Gonzalez-Arnáu, first Marquess of Torres de Mendoza.

The last office under the “Mayordomo” was the General Inspector of the Royal Palaces, the former "Aposentador" (Office that the painter Diego Velázquez had occupied in the 17th century), with an annual wage of 12.500 pesetas. The General Inspector was the real steward and butler to the King. At the fall of the monarchy, this office was occupied by Don Luis de Asúa y Campos. He had his own office in all the Royal residences and was the chief of the watchmen, the doormen, the footmen and the personnel of the so-called "Ramillete", who were the servants and footmen who served at the royal table and the craftsmen of the different workshops (watchmakers, cabinet-makers, cooks, janitors, etc.). All of these offices were equally suppressed in 1931 and no longer exist.

In the reign of Alfonso XIII the wages of the “Mayordomo” were 15.000 pesetas per year and had his own office and quarter at the Royal Palace of Madrid. Likewise, he was always awarded with the highest distinctions of the Kingdom, the neck chain of the Order of the Golden Fleece and the grand cross of the Order of Charles III.

The uniform of the “Mayordomo” was “casacón” (frock coat) with embroidery in all the seams.

He was styled “Excelentísimo señor Mayordomo mayor de Su Majestad” as well as “Sumiller de Corps” and “Guardasellos” (when he held the privy seal).

List of "Mayordomos mayores" (High Stewards) to the King of Spain between 1516 and 1931

“Mayordomos mayores” to Charles V, Holy Roman Emperor, 1516–1556 

 1512–1518: Ferry de Croy, Lord of Roeulx
 1518-1518: Diego de Guevara, Lord of Jouvel
 1518–1522: Ferry de Croy, Lord of Roeulx
 1522–1526: Laurent de Gorrevod, Count of Pont-de-Vaux
 1526–1527: Charles de Lannoy, Lord of Sanzeilles, Grandee of Spain
 1527–1529: Laurent de Gorrevod, Count of Pont-de-Vaux
 1529–1540: Adrien de Croy, Count of Roeulx, Grandee of Spain
 1541–1556: Fernando Álvarez de Toledo y Pimentel,  Duke of Alba de Tormes, Grandee of Spain

“Mayordomos mayores” to King Philip II, 1556–1598 

 1556–1582: Fernando Álvarez de Toledo y Pimentel,  Duke of Alba de Tormes, Grandee of Spain
 1582–1598: Pedro López de Ayala,  Count of Fuensalida, Grandee of Spain

“Mayordomos mayores” to King Philip III, 1598–1621 

 1598–1599: Gómez Dávila y Toledo,  Marquess of Velada, Grandee of Spain
 1599–1621: Juán Hurtado de Mendoza de la Vega y Luna, Duke of the Infantado, Grandee of Spain

“Mayordomos mayores” to King Philip IV, 1621–1665 

 1621–1624: Juán Hurtado de Mendoza de la Vega y Luna, Duke of the Infantado, Grandee of Spain
 1629–1639:  Antonio Álvarez de Toledo y Beaumont,  Duke of Alba de Tormes,  Grandee of Spain
 1640–1642: Gómez  de Mendoza y Manrique, Count of Castrogeriz, Grandee of Spain
 1643–1647: Juan Alfonso Enríquez de Cabrera, Duke of Medina de Rioseco, Admiral of Castile, Grandee of Spain
 1649–1651: Manuel de Moura y Corte-Real, Marquess of Castel-Rodrigo, Grandee of Spain
 1651–1658: Juan Gabriel Pacheco Téllez Girón, Count of la Puebla de Montalbán, Grandee of Spain
 1658–1660:  García de Avellaneda y Haro, Count of Castrillo, Grandee of Spain
 1660–1664: Juan Gaspar Enríquez de Cabrera y Sandoval, Duke of Medina de Rioseco, Admiral of Castile, Grandee of Spain

“Mayordomos mayores” to King Charles II, 1665–1701 

 1665–1667: Bernardo Manrique de Silva y Mendoza,  Marquess of Aguilar de Campoo, Grandee of Spain
 1667–1671: Antonio Álvarez de Toledo y Enríquez de Ribera,  Duke of Alba de Tormes,  Grandee of Spain
 1671–1674: Rodrigo Díaz de Vivar de Silva y Mendoza, Duke of Pastrana and of the Infantado, Grandee of Spain
 1674–1676: Francisco Fernández de la Cueva, Duke of Alburquerque, Grandee of Spain
 1676–1696: Íñigo Melchor Fernández de Velasco, Duke of Frías, Grandee of Spain
 1699–1701: Juan Clarós Pérez de Guzmán y Fernández de Córdoba, Duke of Medina Sidonia, Grandee of Spain

“Mayordomos mayores” to King Philip V, 1701–1724 

 1701–1705:  Fadrique Álvarez de Toledo y Ponce de León, Marquess of Villafranca del Bierzo, Grandee of Spain
 1705–1713: José Fernández de Velasco, Duke of Frías, Grandee of Spain
 1713–1724:  Juan Manuel Fernández Pacheco,  Marquess of Villena, Grandee of Spain

“Mayordomo mayor” to King Louis I, 1724 

 1724:  Juan Manuel Fernández Pacheco,  Marquess of Villena, Grandee of Spain

“Mayordomos mayores” to King Philip V, 1724–1746 

 1724–1725:  Juan Manuel Fernández Pacheco,  Marquess of Villena, Grandee of Spain
1725–1738: Mercurio Antonio López Pacheco, Marquess of Villena, Grandee of Spain
 1738–1746: Francesco María Pico, Duke of la Mirandola,  Grandee of Spain

“Mayordomos mayores” to King Ferdinand VI, 1746–1759 

 1746–1747: Francesco María Pico, Duke of la Mirandola,  Grandee of Spain
 1747: Juan Manuel López de Zúñiga y Castro, Duke of Béjar, Grandee of Spain
 1747–1753: Fadrique Álvarez de Toledo y Moncada, Marquess of Villafranca del Bierzo, Grandee of Spain
 1753–1759: Fernando de Silva y Álvarez de Toledo, Duke of Huéscar, Grandee of Spain

“Mayordomos mayores” to King Charles III, 1759–1788 

 1759–1760: Fernando de Silva y Álvarez de Toledo, Duke of Alba, Grandee of Spain
 1760–1781: José María de Guzmán Guevara, Marquess of Montealegre, Grandee of Spain, Grandee of Spain
 1781–1787: Pedro de Alcántara Fernández de Córdoba y Montcada, Duke of Medinaceli,  Grandee of Spain
 1787–1788: José Joaquín de Silva-Bazán, Marquess of Santa Cruz, Grandee of Spain

“Mayordomos mayores” to King Charles IV, 1788–1808 

 1788–1802: José Joaquín de Silva-Bazán, Marquess of Santa Cruz,  Grandee of Spain
 1802–1805: Diego Ventura de Guzmán, Marquess of Montealegre, Grandee of Spain, Grandee of Spain
 1805–1807: José Miguel de Carvajal y Manrique, Duke of San Carlos, Grandee of Spain
 1807–1808: Benito Fernández Correa y Sotomayor, Marquess of Mos, Grandee of Spain

“Mayordomos mayores” to  King Ferdinand VII, 1808 and 1814–1833 

 1808: José Miguel de Carvajal y Manrique, Duke of San Carlos, Grandee of Spain
 1809–1810: Pedro María Jordán de Urríes y Fuembuena, Marquess of Ayerbe, Grandee of Spain  (1)
 1814–1815: José Miguel de Carvajal y Manrique, Duke of San Carlos, Grandee of Spain
 1815–1820: Francisco de Borja Álvarez de Toledo y Gonzaga, Count of Miranda de Castañar, Grandee of Spain
 1820–1822: Antonio María Ponce de León Dávila, Duke of  Montemar, Grandee of Spain
 1822–1823: José Gabriel de Silva-Bazán, Marquess of Santa Cruz de Mudela,  Grandee of Spain
 1823–1824: Francisco de Borja Álvarez de Toledo y Gonzaga, Count of Miranda de Castañar, Grandee of Spain
 1824–1833: Joaquín Félix de Samaniego Urbina Pizarro y Velandia, Marquess of Valverde de la Sierra, Grandee of Spain

“Mayordomos mayores” to Queen Isabella II, 1833–1868 

 1833–1838: Joaquín Félix de Samaniego Urbina Pizarro y Velandia, Marquess of Valverde de la Sierra, Grandee of Spain
 1838–1847: Juan Bautista Queralt y Silva, Count of Santa Coloma, Grandee of Spain
 1848–1855: Juan Nepomuceno Roca de Togores y Carrasco, Count of Pinohermoso, Grandee of Spain
 1855-1855: Carlos Martínez de Irujo y McKean, Duke of Sotomayor, Grandee of Spain
 1856–1866: Luis Carondelet Castaños, Duke of Bailén, Grandee of Spain
 1866–1868: Francisco Javier Arias Dávila y Matheu, Count of Puñonrostro, Grandee of Spain
 1868: Antonio María Marcilla de Teruel-Moctezuma y Navarro, Duke of Moctezuma de Tultengo, Grandee of Spain

“Mayordomos mayores” to  King Amadeo I, 1871–1873 

1871: Carlos O'Donnell, Duke of Tetuan, Grandee of Spain
 1871–1873: Mariano Rius y Montaner, Count of Rius

“Mayordomo mayor” to  King Alfonso XII, 1875–1885 

 1875–1885: José Isidro Osorio y Silva-Bazán, Marquess of Alcañices, Grandee of Spain

“Mayordomos mayores” to  King Alfonso XIII, 1885–1931 

 1885–1890: José Joaquín Álvarez de Toledo y Silva, Duke of Medina Sidonia, Grandee of Spain
 1890–1906: Carlos Martínez de Irujo y del Alcázar, Duke of Sotomayor, Grandee of Spain
 1906–1907: Manuel Felipe Falcó, Marquess of la Mina, Grandee of Spain
 1907–1925: Andrés Avelino de Salabert y Arteaga, Marquess of la Torrecilla, Grandee of Spain
 1925–1931: Luis María de Silva y Carvajal,  Duke of Miranda, Grandee of Spain

(1) Mayordomo mayor in exile at Valençay

See also
Caballerizo mayor
Gentilhombres de cámara con ejercicio
Gentilhombres Grandes de España con ejercicio y servidumbre

Bibliography 

 Enciclopedia universal ilustrada europeo-americana. Volume 49. Hijos de J. Espasa, Editores.1923
 Martínez Millán José. Universidad Autónoma de Madrid. Departamento de Historia Moderna. La Corte de Carlos V. 2000
 Martinéz Millán (dir). José. La Corte de Felipe II. Madrid. Alianza 1994
 Martínez Millán, José  y Visceglia, Maria Antonietta (Dirs.). La Monarquía de Felipe III. Madrid, Fundación Mapfre, 2008/2009
 Archivo General de Palacio (AGP) . Patrimonio Nacional. Sección Personal

Royal households
Spanish monarchy
Spanish courtiers